Tylosis is a genus of beetles in the family Cerambycidae, containing the following species:

 Tylosis dimidiata Bates, 1892
 Tylosis hilaris Linsley, 1957
 Tylosis jimenezii Dugès, 1879
 Tylosis maculatus LeConte, 1850
 Tylosis nigricollis Chemsak & Hovore, in Eya, 2010
 Tylosis oculatus LeConte, 1850
 Tylosis puncticollis Bates, 1885
 Tylosis suturalis White, 1853
 Tylosis triangularis Monné & Martins, 1981

References

Trachyderini
Cerambycidae genera